Chulym is the name of several inhabited localities in Russia.

Urban localities
Chulym, Chulymsky District, Novosibirsk Oblast, a town in Chulymsky District, Novosibirsk Oblast

Rural localities
Chulym, Kemerovo Oblast, a selo in Chulymskaya Rural Territory of Topkinsky District of Kemerovo Oblast
Chulym, Krasnoyarsk Krai, a settlement in Chulymsky Selsoviet of Novosyolovsky District of Krasnoyarsk Krai
Chulym, Zdvinsky District, Novosibirsk Oblast, a selo in Zdvinsky District of Novosibirsk Oblast